Inverkeithing and Dalgety Bay is one of the 22 wards used to elect members of the Fife council. It elects three Councillors.

Councillors

Election results

2022 Election
2022 Fife Council election

2018 by-election
On 8 June 2018, Inverkeithing and Dalgety Bay Labour Councillor, Shadow Scottish Secretary, and Deputy Leader of Scottish Labour, Lesley Laird resigned her seat as she won the MP seat for Kirkcaldy and Cowdenbeath. A by-election was held on Thursday, 6 September 2018. The seat was won by Conservative candidate Dave Colman.

2017 election

2012 election

2007 election

References

Wards of Fife
Inverkeithing
Dalgety Bay